Randall Abrahams (born ), is a South African TV personality, author and radio presenter best known for adjudicating the Idols SA where he gained the nickname 'The Bad Judge'. He was with the show for the first 17 seasons.

In February 2022, the producers of Idols South Africa released a statement saying that Abrahams would not return as a judge.

In May 2022, Abrahams was appointed as the chief executive officer of Primedia Broadcasting.

Abrahams also served as a managing director for the Universal Music Group in South Africa.

References

External links 

 

South African television presenters
South African television personalities
Living people
1969 births